The Casuchas del Rey or Casuchas de la Cordillera are a string of small mountain shelters made of stone masonry along the route of the Uspallata Pass of the Principal Cordillera in the Andes of Chile and Argentina. The shelters were built to improve the intra-colonial postal system of the Spanish Empire.

The shelters were created following the designs of Ambrosio O'Higgins in 1766 at a time when Cuyo was still part of the Captaincy General of Chile. Each shelter had a capacity for about thirty persons and stock of supplies inside. This included yerba mate as mate was highly valued by those who frequented the cold Andean highlands.

Two events are credited to have triggered the construction of the mountain shelters, first O'Higgins near-death while crossing the Andes in 1763 and the Seven Years' War that made improvements to overland communication an imperative as seaborne communications between Buenos Aires and Lima could be intercepted and while the traditional route across Potosí was overly long.

German painter Johann Moritz Rugendas crossed the Andes in 1835 following the Casuchas del Rey. The 60 paintings and sketches he made on his way have served to locate the remains of the shelters.

References

Argentina–Chile border
Buildings and structures in Valparaíso Region
Buildings and structures in Mendoza Province
18th-century establishments in the Captaincy General of Chile
1766 establishments in South America
Postal history
Mendoza Province
Mountain huts in Argentina
Mountain huts in Chile
History of Valparaíso Region
Principal Cordillera
Buildings and structures completed in 1766